Sparodon, commonly known as the white musselcracker, musselcracker seabream, mussel cracker seabream, brusher, or cracker. is a monotypic genus of fish in the family Sparidae. The type and only known species, Sparodon durbanensis, was first described and named by François Louis Nompar de Caumont de Laporte, comte de Castelnau, in 1861.

The fish is edible and is an important food source in southern Africa.

Description 

S. durbanensis can grow up to a length of 120 centimeters, and a weight of around 22 kilograms. Its head and body are colored silver or gray. It has darker colored fins and a white belly. It has large teeth and has strongly developed jaws, allowing it to eat its prey easier.

Behavior 

S. durbanensis mostly stays in shallow reefs as a juvenile, in depths no greater than 12 m. Some adult specimens are thought to migrate northeasterly seasonally. The average length of time between two generations, called the generation time, is 13 years for the species. Young typically spawn from August to January. They can live to be around 31 years old. The species reaches 50% maturity when it is around  years old.

S, durbanensis eats a variety of invertebrates commonly known as shellfish, including sea urchins, crustaceans, gastropods, and bristle worms. In addition to this, it has also been known to eat Eukaryotes in the Chlorophyta division, a group of green algae.

Distribution and conservation 

S. durbanensis is found in the South-east Atlantic Ocean. It mostly inhabits Southern Africa, and has not been recorded further north than the KwaZulu-Natal province. It lives in shallow coastal tropical waters, in depths of up to 80 meters. The population of S. durbanensis is currently declining. It is listed as "Near Threatened" by IUCN. There are currently several conservation actions taking place, most notability one which limits people to two fish per day.

References 

Edible fish
Species described in 1861
Near threatened biota of Africa
Near threatened animals
Fish of South Africa
Fish of Mozambique
Sparidae
Monotypic fish genera